Titouan is a French given name that is a form of Antoine used in France, Switzerland, Belgium, Canada, West Greenland, Haiti, French Guiana, Madagascar, Benin, Niger, Burkina Faso, Ivory Coast, Guinea, Senegal, Mauritania, Western Sahara, Morocco, Algeria, Tunisia, Chad, Central African Republic, Cameroon, Equatorial Guinea, Gabon, Republic of the Congo, Democratic Republic of the Congo, Burundi, and Rwanda. Notable people with this name include the following:

Titouan Carod (born 1994), French cyclist
Titouan Perrin-Ganier (born 1991), French cross-country mountain biker
Titouan Lamazou (born 1955), French artist and writer

See also

Tétouan
Titou

Notes

French masculine given names